Aleksandr Nikolayevich Bashmakov (born 18 May 1950) is a Belarusian professional football coach.

External links
 

1950 births
Living people
Soviet footballers
Belarusian footballers
FC Belshina Bobruisk players
FC Torpedo-BelAZ Zhodino players
FC Molodechno players
Belarusian football managers
Belarusian expatriate football managers
Expatriate football managers in Russia
FC Dnepr Mogilev managers
FC Dinamo Minsk managers
FC SKVICH Minsk managers
FC Torpedo Minsk managers
Association football midfielders